Bianca Tomina Curmenț (born 12 June 1997) is a Romanian female handball player who plays for SCM Craiova.

International honours
Junior World Championship: 
Bronze Medalist: 2016

References
 

1997 births
Living people
People from Filiași
Romanian female handball players